The Roman Catholic Diocese of Rouyn-Noranda is a Roman Catholic diocese that includes part of the Province of Quebec. It was led by an Apostolic Administrator, Bishop Gilles Lemay (of the diocese of Amos, another suffragan in the eccleastical province of Gatineau), after the retirement of Bishop Dorylas Moreau until the current bishop, Joseph Ferdinand Guy Boulanger, was installed on March 21, 2020.

As of 2004, the diocese contains 38 parishes, 24 active diocesan priests, 9 religious priests, and 58,000 Catholics. It also has 84 women religious, and 10 religious brothers.

Bishops

Diocesan bishops
The following is a list of the bishops of Rouyn-Noranda and their terms of service:
Jean-Guy Hamelin (1973 – 2001)
Dorylas Moreau (30 November 2001 – 25 June 2019)
Joseph Ferdinand Guy Boulanger (31 January 2020 – present)

Other priest of this diocese who became bishop
 Pierre Goudreault, appointed Bishop of Sainte-Anne-de-la-Pocatière, Québec in 2017

References
Diocese of Rouyn-Noranda page at catholichierarchy.org retrieved July 14, 2006

External links
 Roman Catholic Diocese of Rouyn-Noranda Official Site

Rouyn-Noranda
Catholic Church in Quebec
Organizations based in Quebec
Rouyn-Noranda